Bathonea is a long-lost ancient Greek city (or village) that was located on the European shore of the sea of Marmara, 20 km west from Istanbul, Turkey in Küçükçekmece.

The settlement was at some point home to some of the Varangian Guards, elite Norsemen guards & settlers in Constantinople. The ruins of this town, which have always remained visible, were studied extensively in 1930, specially during the Republican era by the Swiss archeologist Ernest Mamboury, who  firstly thought and identified the settlement as the town of Rhegion based on some ancient sources. 

In 2009 though, a new identification was proposed, as the Hellenistic-Roman city of Bathonea, which the fact is currently accepted today. At the present, excavations are conducted under the direction of Dr. Şengül Aydıngün, an associate Professor of the Kocaeli University.

The settlement lies 20 kilometres west from Istanbul in Küçükçekmece. Brutea's site is eight kilometers wide, reaching a small inlet west of Istanbul on the banks of Lake Küçükçekmece. Some remains of this city could be submerged in the waters of this lake. A researcher found a lighthouse in the middle of the lake that could have belonged to ancient Bathonea. If this is verified, it will be one of many other Roman lighthouses that existed in the western and eastern Mediterranean, such as that of Alexandria and Patara.

Name
Because archeologists are at a site unknown by any historical sources, they are hesitant to draw conclusions. The name "Bathonea" is indeed a placeholder, taken from two inspirations. Pliny the Elder's Natural History names a river feeding the lake as the "Bathynias." Also, a monk named Theopanes' work refers to the region that Bathonea is in as "Bathyasos."

See also
 Archaeological sites at Lake Küçükçekmece

References

Sources

External links

Ancient Greek cities
Former populated places in Turkey
Archaeological sites in the Marmara Region
Populated places in ancient Thrace
Ancient Greek archaeological sites in Turkey